Al-Arish is an abandoned village in Qatar, located in the municipality of Ash Shamal. It is one mile south-west of the coastal village of Al Khuwayr.

Etymology
Arish, an Arabic term, refers to palm trees; it was named so after palm trees growing in the area which shaded the entire village.

History
Al Arish was among the villages occupied by Abdullah bin Jassim Al Thani's forces in July 1937 during his military expedition against the Alkubaisi tribe of Zubarah and its supporters, whom he considered to be defectors to Bahrain.

Geography
To the south-west is Sabkhat Al-Arish. A sabkha (salt-flat), its elevation is close to sea level. Due to the high level of salinity, only a small number of trees grow there.

Power station
Inaugurated in 1975 with a power production capacity of 8.5 megawatts, the Al Arish Power Station was constructed to serve as an energy source for Qatar's northern area.

Notable residents
Lahdan bin subah Alkubaisipoet and the leader of Alkubasi tribe

Gallery

References

Al Shamal